Elevated may refer to:
 Elevated (film), a short film by Canadian director Vincenzo Natali
 Elevated railway, a form of rapid transit railway with the tracks built above street level

See also
 Elevation (disambiguation)